Tangutur is a town in Prakasam district of the Indian state of Andhra Pradesh. It is a mandal headquarters  in Ongole revenue division. Nearby towns are Singarayakonda, Kandukur, Prakasam district, Kondapi and the nearest city will be Ongole.

Geography
Tangutur is located at 15°20'26"N 80°2'4"E. It has an average elevation of 36 feet.

Demographics 
According to the 2011 Census of India, with total 7200 families, the total population of Tangutur was 27,652 comprising 13,674 males and 13,978 females. Tangutur has higher literacy rate compared to Andhra Pradesh. In 2011, literacy rate of Tangutur was 68.68% compared to 67.02% of Andhra Pradesh. In Tangutur Male literacy stands at 77.28% while female literacy rate was 60.34%.

See also
 Ongole
 Singarayakonda
 Kandukur, Prakasam district

References 

Villages in Prakasam district
Mandal headquarters in Prakasam district